The mineral industry is one of the main sectors of the Armenian economy and in 2017 accounted for 30.1% of its exports.

Armenia is a major producer of molybdenum, which is used in some high-quality forms of steel, and other alloys. The Zangezur copper-molybdenum complex possesses large molybdenum reserves that are concentrated in the Kajaran deposit. Besides molybdenum, Armenia has significant deposits of copper and gold; smaller deposits of lead, silver, and zinc; and deposits of industrial minerals, including basalt, diatomite, granite, gypsum, limestone, and perlite.

Mines 

According to the Armenian Development Agency, Armenia has more than 670 mines of construction and aggregate minerals, including 30 base metal and precious metal mines. Among these mines, about 400 mines, including 22 base metal, non-ferrous metal and precious metal mines are currently being exploited.

Among the base metal and precious metal deposits, there are 7 copper-molybdenum mines, 3 copper mines, 13 gold and gold-polymetallic mines, 2 polymetalilc mines and 2 iron ore mines.

In addition to those mines registered in the state inventory of mineral resources, there are an additional 115 deposits of various deposits that have been discovered.

Production

In 2017, mining industry output grew by 14.2% to 172 billion AMD at current prices and contribute to 3.1% of Armenia's GDP.

In spite of the global economic crisis of 2008, mining production and revenues grew significantly in 2009 due to a rise in global prices of copper, gold, and other base metals.

In 2005, seventeen mining and metallurgical enterprises were in operation; the largest enterprises mined copper and molybdenum ore or extracted gold from tailings. The country also produces aluminum foil based on raw materials imported from Russia and has a diamond cutting industry using imported raw materials. The country has almost no domestic fuel production and relies on the Armenian Nuclear Power Plant for electric power, as well as hydroelectric plants. Armenia imports fuel for its nuclear powerplant and natural gas from Russia.

The value of mineral production in 2005 totaled $180 million or about 5% of the gross domestic product(GDP). Mining and nonferrous metallurgy accounted for 55% of the value of industrial production. The mineral sector accounted for 11% of the value of the country's capital stock.

In 2005, in the aggregate, the volume of metallic ores mined decreased although nonmetallic ore production increased. The volume of output in both the ferrous and nonferrous metallurgical sectors increased compared with output in 2004. The output volume of individual mineral commodities with respect to output in 2004 varied by commodity.

Foreign Trade
In 2017, mineral product (without precious metals and stones) exports grew by 46.9% and run at US$692 million, which comprised 30.1% of all exports.

In terms of value, cut diamonds are the country's leading mineral export followed by copper and ores and slags, of which molybdenum ores and concentrates had the most value. The country reported significant exports of iron and steel, which were either transshipments or scrap as the county had no domestic steel industry.

Outlook
Further development of the country's mineral production sector is projected as additional funds become available for mineral sector development. Mineral production has been increasing (except for in the diamond-cutting industry) and the country is making a particular effort to attract investment in its mining sector. Molybdenum output is expected to increase as a result of a successful privatization program that involved a $200 million investment that has enabled the Zangezur copper-molybdenum complex to begin reequipping its mining and processing operations in 2005. The goal is to increase the ore-processing capacity at the Kadzharan deposit by 50% to between 12.5 and 13 million metric tons per year (Mt/yr) of ore by 2008. The Armenian Copper Program (ACP) is also in the process of having the large Teghout copper-molybdenum deposit reevaluated and, if it proves feasible for development, the deposit will be second only to the Kadzharan deposit in the size of its copper and molybdenum reserves. International companies are investing in developing gold deposits in Armenia, including Ararat Gold Recovery Company (a 100% subsidiary of Sterlite Ltd. of Canada) and United States-based Global Gold Corp. Production of aluminum foil is also expected to increase with the restarting of the Armenal plant.

In February 2011, a Chinese delegation of the Fortune Oil company said the company plans to invest upwards of $500 million in Armenia's mining industry in two stages.

Corruption

In 2017, Transparency International included the case of Armenia in its research on corruption in mining industry in several countries.

While some mines or their operating licenses are directly owned by Armenian ministers of parliament through a series of holding companies, others are sold to foreign entities by the same or other MPs. In 2010, Paramount Gold Mining, owned by the National Assembly President Hovik Abrahamyan and MP Tigran Arzakantsyan, was awarded a 25-year operating license for the southern portion of the Meghradzor gold mine in the Kotayk Province.  According to Hetq, MP Tigran Arzakantsyan, who has not been seen in parliament for quite a while, is now in Europe seeking out buyers for the mine.  Hovik Abrahamyan was also involved in the sale of the Hankavan gold mine. He also owns an exploratory license for the copper and molybdenum mine in the Vayots Dzor village of Yelpin. The license went to Argamik Ltd., a company registered in the village of Mkhchyan. The company is owned by Argam Abrahamyan, Hovik's son.

In January 2011, the Chinese Fortune Oil Company based in Hong Kong purchased 35% of Bounty Resources Armenia, owner and operator of three iron ore mines in Armenia.  Word of the sale spread through the Internet, with the Armenian government providing no details.  According to the website of the London Stock Exchange, the sale amounted to $24 million.  According to Hetq Investigative Journalism, the sale was a private one by Armenian ministers of parliament Vardan Ayvazyan and Tigran Arzakantsyan who through a series of transactions and holding companies have attempted to hide who the real owners of the companies are and to circumvent government scrutiny.

Environmental impact

According to a study by the Republic of Armenia's RA National Academy of Sciences’ Center for Ecological-Noosphere Studies, mining in Armenia has been disastrous for Armenia in terms of public health and the environment.  Mining operators have failed to neutralize dangerous contaminants which have been absorbed by the ground.  The pollutants then pass from the ground to agricultural produce and then to humans.  57% of Yerevan's population may be living in contaminated conditions due to ground pollution.  Furthermore, the country's rural fields are being irrigated with water flowing from contaminated sources due to mining operations.  Also, according to the study,  all types of farm produce from the towns of Kapan, Kajaran, Alaverdi, and Akhtala (all of which have significant mining operations) are laden with heavy metals, including mercury arsenic and cadmium.

References

External links 
 Center for Responsible Mining
  Mining in Armenia (2012) a 10-minute documentary produced by Robert Davidian and Liana Hakobyan.
 Armenia Supplement (July 2011) by Mining Journal